Boys Abre: The Preacher is a Ghanaian comic and drama TV series produced and directed by Abraham Kofi Davies. The series is aired on United Television Ghana (UTV).

Cast
 Abraham Kofi Davies (Salinko)
 Justice Hymns (Mmebusem)
 Matilda Asare
 Ama Odumaa Odum (Safoa Hemaa)
 Koo Appiah
 Quappiah
 Wofa K
 Kompany
 Amankwah

Awards
 The movie won the 2018-2019 Radio & TV Personality Awards (RTP) as local TV series of the year.

References

Ghanaian television shows
2019 Ghanaian television series debuts
United Television Ghana original programming